Zhang Zetian (born 18 November 1993), also known as Nancy Zhang, is a Chinese businesswoman and investor who is the chief fashion adviser of the luxury business of JD.com. She gained initial fame from the popularity of a photograph of her holding milk tea, and was nicknamed "Sister Milk Tea". She later married JD.com's billionaire founder Liu Qiangdong, and became an investor in several companies. She has been included in the list of Chinese billionaires by New Frontier and is considered to be China's youngest female billionaire.

She holds an MBA of the Cambridge Judge Business School and was a student at King's College.

Career
Zhang initially gained fame when a photograph of her holding a cup of milk tea went viral on the internet. This led to her nickname of "Sister Milk Tea". She went on to appear in a promotional video supporting the 2014 Summer Youth Olympics in Nanjing but turned down an offer to appear in the film The Flowers of War by director Zhang Yimou.

She attended Tsinghua University. While in the United States, she met Liu Qiangdong for the first time, as she was studying at Barnard College. They initially stated that they were only studying together. The pair married in Sydney in 2015 after dating for three years. She was 22; he was 41. It had originally been rumored that the duo were planning to marry in Beijing, after they were photographed at a marriage registry in the city. In March 2016, Zhang gave birth to a daughter.

When the magazine New Fortune published a top 500 Chinese rich list in May 2017, Zhang was the youngest woman on the list. Zhang and Liu share several investments, including holdings in companies such as Uber China and a 17.3% stake of baby food company Bubs Australia via Zhang's investment company. Zhang uses her followers on social media to promote companies she is involved with, which includes her Instagram account and 1.3 million followers on Sina Weibo.

References

Living people
1993 births
Internet memes introduced in 2012
Billionaires from Jiangsu
Businesspeople from Nanjing
Female billionaires
Chinese women business executives
Tsinghua University alumni
Alumni of King's College, Cambridge
Barnard College alumni
JD.com people
21st-century Chinese businesswomen
21st-century Chinese businesspeople
Chinese Internet celebrities